The following is an incomplete list of video games for the MSX, MSX2, MSX2+, and MSX turbo R home computers.

Here are listed  games released for the system. The total number of games published for this platform is over 2000. (Please see external links)

See also
Konami Game Master (1988)
List of Konami games

Notes

References

External links

MSX games